Spin-off may refer to:

Spin-off (media), a media work derived from an existing work
Corporate spin-off, a type of corporate action that forms a new company or entity
 Government spin-off, civilian goods which are the result of military or governmental research
 NASA spin-off, a spin-off of technology that has been commercialized through NASA funding, research, licensing, facilities, or assistance
 Research spin-off, a company founded on the findings of a research group at a university
 University spin-off, a subcategory of research spin-offs
Brand extension, when a firm markets a new product under an already well-known brand

Spin Off or Spin-Off or Spinoff may refer to:
The Spinoff, a New Zealand current affairs magazine 
Spin Off (Canadian game show), a 2013 Canadian game show
Spin-Off (American game show), a 1975 American game show
Spin-Off, a game mode in Wii Party

See also 
 Offshoot (disambiguation)
 Off spin